The Rolls-Royce RB.109 Tyne is a twin-shaft turboprop engine developed in the mid to late 1950s by Rolls-Royce Limited to a requirement for the Vickers Vanguard airliner. It was first test flown during 1956 in the nose of a modified Avro Lincoln. Following company naming convention for gas turbine engines this turboprop design was named after the River Tyne.

Design and development
Designed in 1954 by a team under Lionel Haworth and intended as a more powerful alternative to the Dart, the RB.109 Tyne was initially designed for a power of 2,500 shp but when first run in April 1955 the engine far exceeded expectations and was soon being type-tested at 4,220 shp. The Tyne was developed primarily for the four-engined Vickers Vanguard airliner, the prototype first flying on 20 January 1959 equipped with four Tyne Mk.506 of 4,985 e.s.h.p. Production deliveries of the engine were made from mid-1959 onwards to power the 43 Vanguards delivered to British European Airways and Trans-Canada Airlines.
 
The engine was further developed with greater power and used in the later twin-engined Dassault-Breguet Atlantique long-range reconnaissance aircraft; also in the Canadair CL-44 and Transall C-160 transport aircraft.

A single stage HP turbine drives the nine-stage HP compressor. A three-stage LP turbine drives the six-stage LP compressor and, through a reduction gearbox, the propeller. The combustor is cannular.

The Mark 515 Tyne had a nominal takeoff power output of  equivalent power, flat rated to ISA+16.8C.

An agreement was signed in 1963 between Hispano-Suiza and Rolls-Royce for the licence production of the Tyne for the Breguet Atlantic and Transall C-160. Each company that was part of the agreement built parts for itself and the partners, Rolls-Royce (United Kingdom) 20%, Hispano-Suiza (France) 44%, MAN (Germany) 28% and FN (Belgium) 8%. The final assembly was undertaken by both MAN and Hispano-Suiza. The first production batch was for 80 engines and 40 spares for the Atlantic.

Variants

RTy.12   for Canadair CL-44
RTy.20 Mk 21   for Breguet 1150 Atlantic and Breguet ATL2 Atlantique
RTy.20 Mk 22   for Transall C-160
RTy.20   for Aeritalia G.222T
RTy.20   for Transall C-160 and Breguet ATL2 Atlantique
RTy.22 projected military use engine rated at  equivalent
RTy.32 projected military use engine rated at  equivalent
Mk.101 (RTy.12)
Mk.506
Mk.512
Mk.515
Mk.515-101W
Mk 801
Mk 45
RM1AMarinised ship powerplant
RM1CEssentially similar to the RM1A
RM3CEssentially similar to the RM1A

Applications

Aircraft

Aeritalia G.222
Avro Lincoln (testbed)
Breguet Atlantic
Canadair CL-44
Conroy Skymonster
Short Belfast
Transall C-160
Vickers Vanguard

Ships
The marine version, the Rolls-Royce Tyne RM1A, RM1C and RM3C remained in service as the cruise gas turbines in Royal Navy Type 21 frigates, Type 42 destroyers and Type 22 frigates until the retirement of the 4 Batch 3 Type 22 frigates (2011) and the last remaining Type 42 Destroyer (2013). They were also used in numerous other European ships such as the Tromp and Kortenaer-class frigates.

Engines on display
A Rolls-Royce Tyne is on public display at the Royal Air Force Museum Cosford.
East Midlands Aeropark
Rolls-Royce Heritage Trust, Derby

Specifications (Tyne RTy.20 Mk 21)

See also

References

Notes

Bibliography

External links

"Prop-Jet Economy" a 1959 Flight advertisement for the Tyne

Tyne
1950s turboprop engines